L'Autre Afrique was a monthly news magazine published in Paris, France, published between 1992 and 2002.

History and profile
L'Autre Afrique was founded in 1997 by Paris-based journalist Jean-Baptiste Placca as a response to the "clichéd and often reductive" depiction of Africa in the Western media. In contrast L'Autre Afrique sought to inspire a different reading that reflected the diversity of opinion, realities, terminology and complexities of daily life across a vast continent of more than 50 nations. It was headquartered in Paris. The first issue appeared in May 1997.

L'Autre Afrique was thus characterised by its investigative journalism, coverage and fieldwork reportages. Placca also saw the newspaper as a pedagogical tool and called for African journalists to function as contributing agents to the growth of Africa.

L'Autre Afrique was distributed both in Europe and Africa, to take advantage of the mobility that the French communication and transport infrastructure provided to develop a global network of journalists, analysts and photographers. This network proved difficult to sustain as financial pressures forced L'Autre Afrique to close after only three years. In 2001 Placca resurrected it with a clearer financial structure. The first issue was published on 1 July 2001. In September 2001, the magazine was published weekly. Despite this and the distribution systems, this attempt also failed. L'Autre Afrique ceased publication in September 2002.

References

 "Quel Retour Pour L'autre Afrique? Entretien avec Jean-Baptiste Placca", Africultures.
 Jean-Baptiste Placca, "At the crossroads", Editorial, L'Autre Afrique, p. 104, 23 December–12 January 2000.

1997 establishments in France
2002 establishments in France
Business magazines published in France
Defunct political magazines published in France
Magazines established in 1997
Magazines established in 2001
Magazines disestablished in 2001
Magazines disestablished in 2002
Magazines published in Paris
Monthly magazines published in France
Weekly magazines published in France